Rangfarah is the name chosen for a revivalist movement of Tangsa traditional spirituality. The intention is "to give an alternative form of religious belief to those who were neither following the Christian beliefs nor the traditional ways". "Rangfrah" meaning "God" in the Tangsa dialect was given a form very similar to that of the "Shiva" of the Hindu religion and a worshiping house called "Rangshom Him" was built to place the Rangfrah idol and make arrangement for the followers to gather and offer their prayers.

In the dialects of other Tangsa communities, the term for "God" takes variants such as Rangwa, Rangkhothak, etc. Traditionally, the Tangsas rarely practiced any kind of religious rituals dedicated to the God. However, they generally used various ways to invoke spirits to either receive their benevolent influences or to protect themselves from their malevolent activities. The rituals were mostly invocations, which predominantly involved offerings of animals, rice, rice-beer, eggs, etc. wrapped in leaves of a particular plant and then placing them at a sacred location specific to that particular ritual.

See also
Arunachal Pradesh
Tribal religions in India
Donyi-Polo
Jairampur
Kharsang
Tangsa

References

Religion in Arunachal Pradesh